Ereboenis is a monotypic snout moth genus. Its only species, Ereboenis saturata, is found in southern India. Both the genus and species were first described by Edward Meyrick in 1935.

The larvae are a pest of tea.

References

Phycitinae
Monotypic moth genera
Moths of Asia